Sharif University Metro Station is a station on Tehran Metro Line 2. It is located at the junction of Sohravard Street and Dr. Habibollah Street. It is near Yadegar-e-Emam Expressway and Sharif University of Technology. It is between Shademan Metro Station (formerly known as Azadi Station) and Tarasht Metro Station.

References

Tehran Metro stations